Rudd's lark (Heteromirafra ruddi) is a species of lark in the family Alaudidae. It is endemic to South Africa. Its natural habitat is high-altitude grassland. It is threatened by habitat loss.

Taxonomy and systematics
 Formerly, some authorities have classified Rudd's lark as belonging to the genus Mirafra. Previously, some authorities have also considered Archer's lark to be a subspecies of Rudd's lark (as Heteromirafra ruddi archeri). Alternate names for Rudd's lark include long-clawed lark, Rudd's long-clawed lark and South African long-clawed lark. The name "long-clawed lark" has been used to describe both Rudd's lark and Archer's lark.

References

External links
 Species text - The Atlas of Southern African Birds

Rudd's lark
Endemic birds of South Africa
Rudd's lark
Taxonomy articles created by Polbot